Tringgus is a Dayak language of Borneo.

References

Languages of Malaysia
Languages of Indonesia
Land Dayak languages
Endangered Austronesian languages